María Teresa Giménez Barbat (born 4 June 1955 in Barcelona, Catalonia, Spain) is a Spanish anthropologist, writer and politician. She advocates secular humanism, rationalist universalism and scepticism. She writes in two languages, Spanish and Catalan. She is member of the Spanish political party Union, Progress and Democracy (UPyD) and has participated in anti-nationalist movements before in Catalonia.

Biography 

She studied at the University of Barcelona, where she received a degree in anthropology. In 2008 she promoted the  "Third Culture" association, and in 2009 "Secular Humanism Forum" dedicated to promote an ethic independent of religion.

In 2006 she was a member of the directorate of the political party Citizens of Catalonia, a new non-nationalist party. When UPyD was created with similar ideology, she joined the new formation, and since 2012, was a member of the directorate of the party in Catalonia. She was fifth in the UPyD list of candidates in the 2009 European Parliament Election.

Books 
 Polvo de Estrellas, Barcelona, Kairós 2003.
 Diari d'una escèptica, Barcelona, Tentadero 2007
 Citileaks: los españolistas de la Plaza Real

References

1955 births
Living people
Atheism activists
Spanish anthropologists
Spanish women anthropologists
Spanish humanists
Anti-nationalism in Europe
20th-century Spanish philosophers
21st-century Spanish philosophers
Union, Progress and Democracy MEPs
20th-century Spanish women writers
MEPs for Spain 2014–2019
21st-century women MEPs for Spain
20th-century atheists
21st-century atheists
21st-century Spanish women writers